Meols  (sometimes known as Great Meols) is a village in the Metropolitan Borough of Wirral in Merseyside, England. It forms a contiguous built up area with the nearby town of Hoylake which lies to the west. Historically in Cheshire, since 1 April 1974 it has been part of the Metropolitan Borough of Wirral, in Merseyside.

The 2001 census recorded the population of Meols as 5,110. 
In the 2011 census specific population figures for Meols were not available. The total population of the Hoylake and Meols local government ward was 13,348.

History
becoming melas by the time of the Domesday Survey.

Impressive archaeological finds dating back to the Neolithic period suggest that the site was an important centre in antiquity. Since about 1810, a large number of artefacts have been found relating to pre-Roman Carthage, the Iron Age, the Roman Empire, Armenia, the Anglo-Saxons and the Vikings. These include items as varied as coins which belonged to the Coriosolites in Brittany. Also, tokens, brooches, pins, knives, glass beads, keys, pottery, flint tools, mounts, pilgrim badges, pieces of leather, worked wood and iron tools. They came to be discovered after the beginning of large-scale dredging (to accommodate the needs of the nearby growing seaport of Liverpool) started to cause notable sand erosion along the coastline near Meols. These finds suggest that the site was used as a port as far back as the Iron Age some 2,400 years ago, and was once the most important seaport in the present-day North West England. Thus trading connections are believed to have reached far across Europe.
Some of these artefacts are on display locally, at the Museum of Liverpool.
In the 1890s the local authorities built the first sea wall. The rapidly eroding coastline was saved, but the sea wall changed the currents and archaeological sites at Meols were buried in the sand. 
The remains of a submerged forest off Dove Point have now also disappeared but they were visible until the spring of 1982.

In 1938 a Viking (Nordic clinker) boat was discovered beneath  of clay when the 'Railway Inn' public house was being rebuilt. Workers at the time covered the ship over again so as not to delay the construction of the pub's new car park.
The pub landlord mentioned its previous discovery to local police constable Tim Baldock, who contacted Professor Stephen Harding of the University of Nottingham. Ground penetrating radar (GPR) equipment was used to confirm its existence and precise location on 10 September 2007.

Meols was formerly called Great Meols. It was a township in West Kirby parish of the Wirral Hundred before becoming a civil parish from 1866. On 31 December 1894 it was abolished to create the Hoylake and West Kirby civil parish. Great Meols had a population of 140 in 1801, 170 in 1851 and 821 in 1901. 
Between 1894 and 1974 it was within Hoylake Urban District. 
On 1 April 1974, local government reorganisation in England and Wales resulted in most of the Wirral Peninsula, including Meols, transfer from the county of Cheshire to the newly created county of Merseyside.

The historic name of Great Meols survives in the name of the primary school and the Anglican church. It was still in more general use up to the 1960s, for instance in postal addresses and on the destination indicators of buses from Chester. There also used to be a village called Little Meols, on Meols Drive between Hoylake and West Kirby
The name Little Meols fell out of use in Victorian times, having been absorbed by Hoylake. From 123 inhabitants in 1801 and 170 in 1851, by 1901 at 2,850, its population had outstripped Great Meols.

Meols was known to be spelt as Meolse up until when the railway station was placed. The error came about at the time of the station's construction, when rail managers took the spelling of Meols from the Southport suburb of Meols Cop and used it for new signage.

Geography
Meols is at the north-western corner of the Wirral Peninsula, adjacent to the Irish Sea.

Governance
Meols is within the parliamentary constituency of Wirral West. The current Member of Parliament is Margaret Greenwood, a Labour representative.

At local government level, the area is incorporated into the Hoylake and Meols Ward of the Metropolitan Borough of Wirral, in the metropolitan county of Merseyside. It is represented on Wirral Metropolitan Borough Council by three councillors. 
The most recent local elections took place on 6 May 2021.

Community

Meols is mainly residential with a small yacht and fishing community on its Irish Sea shore line. The centre has a small row of shops adjacent to Meols railway station, the 'Railway Inn' public house and a primary school. The North Wirral Coastal Park stretches from Dove Point in Meols to New Brighton. There is also a local community park known as Meols Park and Recreation Ground and a bowling green. The Friends of Meols Park are a community group set up in 2007 to help maintain and improve the recreation ground.

Transport
The area is served by Meols railway station on the West Kirby branch of Merseyrail's Wirral line.

Bus

A number of school services also serve Meols.

Notable people and cultural references
Cyclist Chris Boardman, winner of a gold medal for Great Britain at the 1992 Summer Olympics, lived in Meols before moving to nearby Hoylake.

Miles Kane, former member of the Little Flames, the Rascals, one half of the Last Shadow Puppets with the Arctic Monkeys frontman Alex Turner and now a successful solo artist, is from Meols.

Andy McCluskey, the co-founder, singer and bass guitarist of the electronic music band Orchestral Manoeuvres in the Dark (OMD) is also from Meols. OMD had a track called "Red Frame/White Light" from their self-titled debut album which referred to the public telephone box between the church and the Railway Inn on Greenwood Road, Meols. Hidden within the lyrics was the telephone number of the telephone box (632-3003). It is claimed that fans would call that telephone number from all over the world. The telephone box was removed by BT in August 2017 but was returned by October after a campaign by fans of the duo, and now displays a plaque noting its significance.

The television sitcom Watching, produced by Granada Television between 1987 and 1993, utilised Meols as a filming location. This was likely because the characters Malcolm and Mrs Stoneway lived in the village.

See also
Listed buildings in Hoylake

References

Bibliography

External links

 Friends of Meols Park

Towns and villages in the Metropolitan Borough of Wirral
Viking Age populated places
Beaches of Merseyside